Dundonald is a village in Gert Sibande District Municipality in the Mpumalanga province of South Africa. It was formerly part of the KaNgwane homeland.

References

Populated places in the Albert Luthuli Local Municipality